The 1975 Fresno State Bulldogs football team represented California State University, Fresno as a member of the Pacific Coast Athletic Association (PCAA) during the 1975 NCAA Division I football season. Led by J. R. Boone in his third and final season as head coach, Fresno State compiled an overall record of 5–7 with a mark of 1–4 in conference play, placing fifth in the PCAA. The Bulldogs played their home games at Ratcliffe Stadium on the campus of Fresno City College in Fresno, California.

Schedule

Team players in the NFL
The following were selected in the 1976 NFL Draft.

The following finished their Fresno State career in 1975, were not drafted, but played in the NFL.

References

Fresno State
Fresno State Bulldogs football seasons
Fresno State Bulldogs football